Valentina Turisini (born August 16, 1969) is an Italian sport shooter and Olympic champion. She received a silver medal at the 2004 Summer Olympics in Athens.

References

1969 births
Living people
Italian female sport shooters
ISSF rifle shooters
Olympic shooters of Italy
Olympic silver medalists for Italy
Shooters at the 2004 Summer Olympics
Shooters at the 2008 Summer Olympics
Olympic medalists in shooting
Medalists at the 2004 Summer Olympics